Sofronovskaya is a rural locality (a village) in Gorodishchenskoye Rural Settlement, Nyuksensky District, Vologda Oblast, Russia. The population was 74 as of 2002.

Geography 
Sofronovskaya is located 39 km southeast of Nyuksenitsa (the district's administrative centre) by road. Verkhnyaya Gorka is the nearest rural locality.

References 

Rural localities in Nyuksensky District